SDF-1 may refer to:

Stromal cell-derived factor 1, a protein in cell biology
SDF-1 Macross, a fictional spaceship from the anime series The Super Dimension Fortress Macross